Martin Scorsese Presents the Blues: Piano Blues is the soundtrack to the documentary film directed by Clint Eastwood. This is the seventh part of the critically acclaimed television documentary series Martin Scorsese Presents The Blues shown on PBS in September 2003.  This collection of music represents what Clint said "...in my film Piano Blues I'm trying to investigate who influenced everyone, and who the great players were."

Track listing

References

See also
 The Blues Radio Series

Television soundtracks
2003 compilation albums
Blues compilation albums
2003 soundtrack albums